Landed is the sixth studio album by the German krautrock band Can.

Recording and production
Landed was recorded in 1975 at Inner Space Studios in Weilerswist, near Cologne. Holger Czukay engineered the recording and mixed side B at Inner Space. He teamed with Toby Robinson to mix side A at Studio Dierks in Stommeln. René Tinner assisted with the mix for both sides. The album was produced by the band themselves and included the single "Hunters and Collectors" (backed by "Vernal Equinox"), which was issued on Virgin that same year.

Reception
Dominique Leone reviewed the album for Pitchfork in 2005.

Musician Barry Adamson included the album in a list of his 13 favorite albums.

Australian rock band Hunters & Collectors took their name from the song of the same title.

Track listing

Notes

Personnel

Can
Holger Czukay – bass, vocals on "Full Moon on the Highway"
Michael Karoli – guitar, violin, lead vocals
Jaki Liebezeit – drums, percussion, winds
Irmin Schmidt – keyboards, Alpha 77, vocals on "Full Moon on the Highway"
 – tenor saxophone on "Red Hot Indians"

Production
Holger Czukay – engineer, mixing
Toby Robinson – mixing (Side A only)
René Tinner  –  recording assistant and road management
Bobby Hickmott – equipment control
Christine – cover collage
J. B. Lansing – P.A.
Farfisa keyboards – electronics
Alpha 77 - Zurich  – electronics

References

External links
 

1975 albums
Can (band) albums
Mute Records albums
Virgin Records albums